Dieudonné Owona (born February 28, 1986 in Yaoundé) is a Cameroonian footballer. He currently plays as a defender for Grande-Synthe in France.

Career
Born in Cameroon, at the age of 15 Owona moved to Lille's Academy in France.

In January 2007 Owona joined FC Brussels on loan for the duration of the 2006–07 season. He made his Belgian Pro League début in a game against R.A.E.C. Mons on 20 January; the game finished 1–1. A week later, he scored his first goal in a 2–0 home win over Zulte Waregem. Owona finished the season with 13 appearances.

References

External links

1986 births
Living people
Cameroonian footballers
Association football defenders
Lille OSC players
R.W.D.M. Brussels F.C. players
Olympique Grande-Synthe players
PFC Beroe Stara Zagora players
Maccabi Umm al-Fahm F.C. players
First Professional Football League (Bulgaria) players
Liga Leumit players
Expatriate footballers in Bulgaria
Expatriate footballers in Israel
Expatriate footballers in Belgium
Entente Feignies Aulnoye FC players